The Lycabettus Funicular is a funicular railway to the top of Mount Lycabettus in the Greek capital city of Athens. It was constructed in the 1960s by the Greek Tourist Organisation (EOT) and was inaugurated on April 18, 1965. The terminal stations are situated at Aristippou street, in Kolonaki, and the Chapel of St. George, near the top of the hill. Between the terminal stations, the line is entirely in tunnel.

In 2002 extensive refurbishment was carried out, involving replacement of the motor, of the hydraulic brake unit, of the electronics safety systems, of the control room and of the two cars of the funicular. The railway now runs daily services, with a capacity of about 400 persons per hour.

Operation 
The line has the following parameters:

See also 
 List of funicular railways

References

External links 
 

Funicular railways in Greece
Railway lines opened in 1965
Transport in Athens